Chimney Rock is an  pillar located on the shared boundary of Hinsdale County with Ouray County, in southwest Colorado, United States. It is situated 10.5 miles east of the community of Ridgway, and immediately south of Owl Creek Pass, in the Uncompahgre Wilderness, on land managed by Uncompahgre National Forest. Owl Creek Pass separates Chimney Rock from Cimarron Ridge to the north. It is part of the San Juan Mountains which are a subset of the Rocky Mountains, and is situated west of the Continental Divide. Chimney Rock can be seen from Highway 550 near Ridgway. This feature's name was officially adopted by the United States Board on Geographic Names in 1966, prior to that it was known as Chimney Peak. The first ascent was made in 1934 by Melvin Griffiths and Robert Ormes via the 400-foot south face, which is the only established climbing route.

Climate 
According to the Köppen climate classification system, Chimney Rock is located in an alpine subarctic climate zone with cold, snowy winters, and cool to warm summers. Due to its altitude, it receives precipitation all year, as snow in winter, and as thunderstorms in summer, with a dry period in late spring. Precipitation runoff from the east side of the mountain drains into tributaries of the Cimarron River, and from the west side into Uncompahgre River via Cow Creek.

Films 
Chimney Rock appeared in Rooster Cogburn's climactic shootout of the 1969 western motion picture, True Grit, starring John Wayne. It is also seen in the 1962 epic, How the West Was Won, as Gregory Peck tries to tow a covered wagon stuck in the mud.

Gallery

See also 

 Precipice Peak
 Dunsinane Mountain
 Geology of Colorado

References

External links 

 Weather forecast: National Weather Service
 Chimney Rock and Courthouse Mountain photo: Flickr

Landforms of Ouray County, Colorado
Landforms of Hinsdale County, Colorado
San Juan Mountains (Colorado)
Mountains of Colorado
North American 3000 m summits
Uncompahgre National Forest